Akçam is a Turkish surname. Notable people with the surname include:

 Alper Akçam, Turkish footballer
 Taner Akçam, Turkish historian

See also
 Akçam, Abana, a village in Turkey
 Akçam, Köprüköy

Turkish-language surnames